Hana-Kimi or known originally as  in Japan, is a shōjo manga series written and illustrated by Hisaya Nakajo. The series was first serialized in the 20th issue of Hakusensha's semi-monthly shōjo manga magazine, Hana to Yume in 1996. Its serialization continued where the series ended with 23 tankōbon volumes with 144 chapters without including 5 special chapters that were published during the series' serialization and another 5 special chapters that were published after the series ended.

The series' 23 volumes were first published under the Hana to Yume Comics. It was then later re-published into 12 volumes of aizōban under the Hana to Yume Comics Special imprint. Each volume featured a new cover illustration and design as well as colored pages.

Hana-Kimi was also published in English by Viz Media. The English release was previously only limited to Waldenbooks from February to May 2004. It was then made available to other retail stores after May that year. The English title originated from a fan abbreviation of the original Japanese title as the official U.S. translation ends the title with a he instead of e.



Volume list

References

Hana-Kimi